Amulius is a genus of Asian bugs in the family Reduviidae.  It has been placed in the tribe Ectinoderini: the 'Oriental resin bugs' (although some authorities elevate this to the subfamily Ectinoderinae).

Determination
The two genera of Oriental resin bugs appear to be very similar but can be differentiated by careful examination of the head region.  With Amulius the first antennal segment is much shorter (<50%) than the head length, but in Ectinoderus this segment is always distinctly longer than the head.  Species in this genus require review.

Species 
The Global Biodiversity Information Facility lists:
 Amulius armillatus Breddin, 1900
 Amulius bipustulatus Bergroth, 1913
 Amulius confragosus Distant, 1919
 Amulius immaculatus Miller, 1955
 Amulius longiceps Stål, 1866
 Amulius malayus Stål, 1866
 Amulius quadripunctatus (Stål, 1859)
 Amulius rubrifemur Breddin, 1895 - India
 Amulius sumatranus Roepke, 1932
 Amulius viscus Distant, 1911

References

External links

Reduviidae
Hemiptera of Asia